Edo South Senatorial District in Edo State covers seven local governments which include Oredo, Ovia South West, Egor, Ovia North East, Orhionmwon, Ikpoba Okha and Uhunmwode local government areas.  Oredo LGA is the headquarters (collation centre) of Edo South.  The current representative of Edo South is Mathew Uroghide  of the People's Democratic Party (PDP).

List of senators representing Edo South 

LIST OF SENATORS REPRESENTING EDO NORTH

References 

Politics of Edo State
Senatorial districts in Nigeria